The women's 100 metre freestyle event at the 2015 European Games in Baku took place on 23 and 24 June at the Aquatic Palace.

Results

Heats
The heats were started on 23 June at 09:50.

Semifinals
The semifinals were started on 23 June at 18:29.

Semifinal 1

Semifinal 2

Final
The final was held on 24 June at 18:22.

References

Women's 100 metre freestyle
2015 in women's swimming